The men's javelin throw at the 2018 European Athletics Championships took place at the Olympic Stadium on 8 and 9 August.

Records

Schedule

Results

Qualification
Qualification: 82.00 m (Q) or best 12 performers (q)

Final

References

Javelin Throw M
Discus throw at the European Athletics Championships